Bruno Paes may refer to:

 Bruno Paes (footballer) (born 1982), Brazilian footballer
 Bruno Paes (field hockey) (born 1993), Brazilian field hockey player